Becamex Binh Duong Football Club, simply known as Becamex Binh Duong, is a professional football club based in Thu Dau Mot, Binh Duong province, Vietnam. It currently plays in Vietnam's top division, the V.League 1. Their home ground is Go Dau Stadium.

History

1976–1996

In 1976, the club was established as Sông Bé F.C., named after the Bé River, a well-known river in Bình Dương Province. The first club's head coach was Do Thoi Vinh.

In 1978, two Sông Bé teams competed in the National Division A, with Sông Bé II winning the regional championship. Afterward, the two sides were merged into one club under head coach Nguyen Kim Phung.

In 1994, Sông Bé won its first ever national title, the Vietnamese National Cup. One year later, however, they were relegated from the Vietnamese National First Division (the highest competition in Vietnam at that time) as punishment by the VFF after Sông Bé and 3 other clubs refused to play 2 relegation play-off matches.

In 1996, Sông Bé and Cao Su Binh Long merged into one club which achieved promotion to the top competition that same year.

1997–2001

In January 1997, the club was renamed Bình Dương after Sông Bé Province was divided into two parts, Bình Dương and Bình Phước.

In 1998, Bình Dương was relegated from the First Division and suffered for some years from a lack of development.

2002–present

In 2002, Bình Dương Football Joint-stock Company was founded when Bình Dương FC was taken over by Bình Dương Television Broadcaster (BTV) and Becamex IDC, the strongest multi-industry economy corporation in Bình Dương. The financial backing from Becamex IDC was a huge boost for the club.

In 2003, Becamex Bình Dương won promotion to the V.League, marking the emergence of the new football powerhouse in Vietnam. During this time, the club earned the nickname Chelsea of Vietnam for its strong financial backing.

In 2007 and 2008, Bình Dương won two consecutive V-League titles. They repeat that again in 2014 and 2015.

Bình Dương also won Vietnamese National Football Cup two times, in 2015 and 2018.

Stadium
Gò Đậu Stadium is a multi-use stadium in Thủ Dầu Một. It is currently used primarily for football matches and is the home stadium of Becamex Bình Dương. The stadium holds 18,250 people.

Kit suppliers and shirt sponsors

Current squad
Updated 17 January 2023

Continental record
All results (home and away) list Becamex's goal tally first.

Season-by-season records

Honours

National competitions
League
V.League 1
 Winners (4): 2007, 2008, 2014, 2015
 Runners-up (2): 2006, 2009
V.League 2
 Runners-up (1): 2003
Cup
Vietnamese National Cup
 Winners (3): 1994 (as Sông Bé), 2015, 2018
 Runners-up (3): 2008, 2014, 2017
Vietnamese Super Cup
 Winners (4): 2007, 2008, 2014, 2015
 Runners-up (1): 2018

Other competitions
BTV Cup
 Winners (8): 2002, 2003, 2005, 2012, 2013, 2017, 2019, 2021

 Runners-up (3): 2006, 2008, 2011

Mekong Club Championship
 Winners (1): 2014

Coaching staff

Managers by years (2002–present)

References

External links
Official website 
V.League profile 
Soccerway profile

 
Association football clubs established in 1976
Football clubs in Vietnam
1976 establishments in Vietnam
Works association football clubs in Vietnam